Star of the Sea is a historical novel by the Irish writer Joseph O'Connor published in 2002. The novel is set in 1847 against the backdrop of the Irish famine. Star of the Sea became an international number one bestseller, selling more than 800,000 copies in a year.

Plot
The Star of the Sea of the title is a famine ship, making the journey from Ireland to New York. Aboard are hundreds of refugees, many from humble and desperate backgrounds. Key protagonists are David Merridith Lord Kingscourt, his wife Laura, their servant Mary Duane, the ship's captain Josias Lockwood, a friendless Irishman named Pius Mulvey, and American journalist Grantley Dixon.

The story has multiple threads interwoven by Grantley Dixon. He uses diaries, letters, his own articles and conversations/interviews with some of the main characters or their relatives/descendants. The story partly follows the chronological course of the voyage, and for the intermediate or interposed parts consists of the meshed-in background lives of some of the emigrants and their relatives before they left Ireland (or England, or even after they arrived in the US). The novel departs from the usual formula of a murder mystery in that readers are vaguely informed of the identity of the murderer and the victim early in the novel, but the murder does not take place until the closing pages of the novel, and murder does not carry the full idea or sense of the killing.

As the writer was clearly aware in choosing the name, the term "Star of the Sea" has deep roots in Catholic tradition. Our Lady, Star of the Sea - a translation of the Latin Stella Maris - is the Blessed Virgin Mary in her aspect as a guide and protector to those who work or travel on the sea and under which title she is venerated in many Catholic seaside communities. Indeed, in Dutch and other translations the book was given the title "Stella Maris".

In 2008, London band Silvery released the song "Star of the Sea" on their debut album Thunderer & Excelsior on Blow Up Records, loosely following the narrative of the book.

O'Connors 2007 book Redemption Falls is in effect a sequel to the book, set in the aftermath of the American Civil War and featuring some character crossover.

Publication history
The book was first published in 2002 by Secker & Warburg in the United Kingdom. and in paperback in 2003 by Vintage UK. A paperback edition was issued on 1 January 2004 by Random House.

Awards
Star of the Sea has collected many awards and shortlistings:

 A New York Times Notable Book of: 2004
 An Economist Book of the Year: 2004
 Voted as one of 15 Vintage Future Classics: 2005
 A Sunday Times No 1 bestseller in paperback
 May 2004: Nielsen Booktrack best-selling adult fiction paperback of the year: more than 850,000 copies in print
 Richard & Judy Book Club (UK) selection: 2004
 Runner-up for the Nibbie Best Read Award at the British Book Awards: 2004
 Shortlisted for the Sunday Independent Irish Novel of the Year Award
 Winner of the Prix Madeleine Zepter Award for European Novel of the Year, France
 Nominated for the International IMPAC Dublin Literary Award: 2003
 Winner of the Acerbi Foundation Award Prize, Italy: 2003
 One of Le Point's 15 Best Books of the Year: 2003
 Winner of the Prix Millepages Award: 2003
 Hennessy / Sunday Tribune Hall of Fame Award winner: 2003
 Winner of the 2004 Irish Post Award for Literature
 Voted one the annual 25 Books to Remember 2003 by the New York Public Library service 
 800,000 copies sold in the UK in one year alone
 Featured in May 2009 International Baccalaureate English HL A1 Exam

References

2004 Irish novels
Fiction set in 1847
Historical novels
Irish diaspora
Novels by Joseph O'Connor
Works about the Great Famine (Ireland)